The discography of the Japanese band Wagakki Band consists of six studio albums, two compilation albums, and seventeen singles released since 2014.

Albums

Studio albums

Compilations

Live albums

Other releases

Extended plays

Singles

Regular singles

Split singles

Digital-only singles

Videography

Video singles

Video albums

Footnotes

References

External links 
 

Discography
Discographies of Japanese artists
Pop music discographies
Heavy metal discographies